René Gérard (8 June 1914 – 7 July 1987) was a French footballer who played as a midfielder for Montpellier, FC Sète, Red Star, CA Paris and France.

Club career
Gérard began his career with hometown club Montpellier, remaining with the club during French football's transition to professionalism in 1932. Gérard stayed at Montpellier until 1934, signing for FC Sète in 1935. Gérard stayed with the club for one season, scoring eight goals in 26 league games. The following season, Gérard signed for Red Star, staying with the club for two seasons. In 1938, Gérard signed for CA Paris. Gérard stayed with the club until the suspension of French football in the 1939–40 season, due to the outbreak of World War II.

International career
In 1932, Gérard became the third youngest player to be called up by France at the age of 17 and 11 months. His record stood until 2020, when Rennes midfielder Eduardo Camavinga replaced him as the third youngest call-up in French history. On 8 May 1932, Gérard made his debut for France in a 3–1 defeat against Scotland. On 19 March 1933, Gérard scored twice against Germany in a 3–3 draw in Berlin.

International goals
Scores and results list France's goal tally first.

References

1914 births
1987 deaths
Footballers from Montpellier
French footballers
Association football midfielders
France international footballers
Montpellier HSC players
FC Sète 34 players
Red Star F.C. players
CA Paris-Charenton players
Ligue 1 players